GxP is a general abbreviation for the "good practice" quality guidelines and regulations. The  "x" stands for the various fields, including the pharmaceutical and food industries, for example good agricultural practice, or GAP.

A "c" or "C" is sometimes added to the front of the initialism. The preceding "c"  stands for "current." For example, cGMP is an acronym for "current good manufacturing practice".  The term GxP is frequently used to refer in a general way to a collection of quality guidelines.

Purpose 
The purpose of the GxP quality guidelines is to ensure a product is safe and meets its intended use. GxP guides quality manufacture in regulated industries including food, drugs, medical devices, and cosmetics.

The most central aspects of GxP are Good Documentation Practices (GDP), which are expected to be ALCOA:
 Attributable: documents are attributable to an individual
 Legible:       they are readable
 Contemporaneously Recorded: not dated in the past or the future, but when the documented task is completed
 Original or a True Copy
 Accurate: accurately reflecting the activity documented
 and Permanent,

The products that are the subject of the GxP are expected to be
 Traceability: the ability to reconstruct the development history of a drug or medical device.
 Accountability: the ability to resolve who has contributed what to the development and when.

GxPs require that a Quality System be established, implemented, documented, and maintained.

As explained above, documentation is a critical tool for ensuring GxP adherence. For more information, see good manufacturing practice.

Examples of GxPs 
 Good agricultural and collection practices, or GACP(s)
 Good agricultural practice, or GAP
 Good auditing practice, or GAP
 Good automated laboratory practice, or GALP
 Good automated manufacturing practice, or GAMP
 Good business practice, or GBP
 Good cell culture practice, or GCCP
 Good clinical data management practice, or GCDMP
 Good clinical laboratory practice, or GCLP
 Good clinical practice, or GCP
 Good documentation practice, or GDP, or GDocP (to distinguish from "good distribution practice")
 Good distribution practice, or GDP
 Good engineering practice, or GEP
 Good financial practice, or GFP
 Good guidance practice, or GGP
 Good horticultural practice, or GHP
 Good hygiene practice, or GHP
 Good laboratory practice, or GLP
 Good management practice, or GMP
 Good manufacturing practice, or GMP
 Good microbiological practice, or GMiP
 Good participatory practice, or GPP
 Good pharmacovigilance practice, or GPvP or even GVP
 Good pharmacy practice, or GPP
 Good policing practice, or GPP
 Good recruitment practice, or GRP
 Good research practice, or GRP
 Good safety practice, or GSP
 Good storage practice, or GSP
 Good tissue practice, or GTP

See also 
 Best practice
 European Medicines Agency (EMA)
 Food and Drug Administration (FDA)
 International Conference on Harmonisation of Technical Requirements for Registration of Pharmaceuticals for Human Use (ICH)
 Organisation for Economic Co-operation and Development (OECD)
 Validation (drug manufacture)
 Society of Quality Assurance, a professional group focused on GxP-regulated environments

References 

Good